Graham Hogg is a former Scotland 7s international rugby union player. He is a founder of the Make Minds Move charity; a mental health charity.

Rugby union career

Amateur career
He played for Hawick.

He was awarded the John MacPhail scholarship in 2006 and played club rugby in New Zealand.

He played for Biella rugby club in Italy.

He played for the 'G-Force' team of East Grinstead.

He later played for Greenock Wanderers when he was also a development officer at the club. He took the team to the Shield final at Murrayfield in 2019. He retired at the end of that season.

Provincial and professional career
He played for Borders U16 and Borders U18 grades.

He was with the Border Reivers shortly before the club folded in 2007.

International career
He was capped at age-grades for Scotland at Under 18, Under 19 and Under 20s.

He then went on to secure Scotland 7s caps, and represented Scotland in the Hong Kong Sevens event twice.

Coaching career
He coached at West of Scotland.

He was a development officer at East Grinstead when he played there.

He was a development coach for the English Rugby Union in 2016-17.

He then became a development officer at Greenock Wanderers.

Charity career
Hogg set up the charity Make Minds Move to try and remove stigma around mental health issues, with his friend Adam Clayton from Sussex.

Hogg explained that he set-up the charity to do a cycling challenge to raise monies for mental health:
Adam was my captain when I played down south at G-Force in East Grinstead and I gave him a call because I knew he was involved in events and could help me perhaps get the cycling challenge off the ground.

He was keen to help and we also got chatting about mental health issues that we had both faced in our careers. We both played at good levels, but went through a lot of different things and we are really passionate about trying to help guys who are transitioning out of rugby and the younger generation coming through.

We don't want them to get as low as we were at one stage and we hope that Make Minds Move can get more guys talking with their team mates and their former team mates as well as opening up in general with the physical challenges thrown in to really get people focused on something away from the rugby field, but something that is testing and fun.

Hogg and Clayton completed a 24 hour cycling marathon in June 2020.

Business career
He was a Sports Agent for TDB Sports in 2020.

He now works as a Sales Executive for Borders Motor Group.

Family
His brother is the Scotland international player Stuart Hogg.

His father John Hogg won the league with Hawick and is now a rugby union referee.

References

External links
itsrugby.co.uk Profile

1987 births
Living people
Hawick RFC players
Scotland international rugby sevens players
Greenock Wanderers RFC players
Border Reivers players
Scottish rugby union players